Under the Sun is found in the Bible, Ecclesiastes 1:9, "The thing that hath been, it is that which shall be; and that which is done is that which shall be done: and there is no new thing under the sun." It may also refer to:

Film
Under the Sun (1998 film) (Under solen), a 1998 Swedish film directed by Colin Nutley
Under the Sun (2015 film), a Russian documentary film directed by Vitaly Mansky
Under the Sun, a 1994 British independent film directed by Michael Winterbottom

Literature
Under the Sun, a literary journal published by Tennessee Tech University
Under the Sun, a novel by Justin Kerr-Smiley

Music

Albums
Under the Sun (Ida Corr album)
Under the Sun (Cathy Leung album)
Under the Sun (Yosui Inoue album)
Under the Sun (Paul Kelly album)
Under The Sun (Gordon Gano & The Ryans album)

Songs
"Under the Sun" (Cheryl song), a single by Cheryl Cole
"Under the Sun" (Do As Infinity song), a song by Do As Infinity
"Under the Sun" (Dreamville, J. Cole and Lute song), a song by Dreamville
"Under the Sun" (L.A.B. song), a song by L.A.B.
"Under the Sun," the title track from the album Under the Sun (Ida Corr album), featuring Shaggy
"Under the Sun," the title track from the album Under the Sun (Yosui Inoue album)
"Under the Sun," the title track from the album Under the Sun (Paul Kelly album)
"Under the Sun," a song by Big Kenny on the album Live a Little
"Under the Sun," a song by Black Sabbath on the album Black Sabbath Vol. 4
"Under the Sun", a song by Dreamville on the compilation album Revenge of the Dreamers III
"Under the Sun," a song by the Buzzcocks on the album Modern
"Under the Sun," a song by The Dreams on the album Revolt
"Under the Sun," a song by Korpiklaani on the album Tales Along This Road
"Under the Sun," a song by Marillion on the album Radiation
"Under the Sun," a song by Thirteen Senses on the album Contact
"Under the Sun," a song by Michael Weatherly on the NCIS (soundtrack), Volume 4
"Under the Sun," a song by Ruston Kelly on the album Shape & Destroy

Ecclesiastes